= Risby mine =

Tungsten mine in Yukon, Canada

- Location: Yukon, Canada
- Products: Tungsten

The Risby mine is a large open pit mine located in the eastern part of Canada in Yukon. Risby represents one of the largest tungsten reserves in Canada having estimated reserves of 8.5 million tonnes of ore grading 0.47% tungsten.
